Farrant is an English surname. Notable people with the surname include:

Daniel Farrant (1575–1651), English composer, viol player and instrument maker
Danny Farrant, English drummer
David Farrant (born 1960), New Zealand cricketer
Anthony Farrant (1955–2013), New Zealand cricketer
David Farrant, psychic investigator in the Highgate Vampire case
Gary Farrant (born 1946), Australian football player
John Farrant, (perhaps more than one) sixteenth century organist in Salisbury Cathedral and Ely Cathedral
M. A. C. Farrant (born 1947), Canadian short fiction writer, memoirist, journalist, and humourist
Otto Farrant (born 1996), British actor
Paul Farrant, British slalom canoer
Percy Farrant (1868–1921), Welsh cricketer and educator
Richard Farrant (c. 1525–1580), English composer of church music
Samuel Farrant, English footballer
Tash Farrant (born 1996), English cricketer
Walt Farrant (1912–1977), Canadian ice hockey player

Given name
Farrant Reed (1865–1911), English cricketer